The 2007 World Table Tennis Championships men's singles event took place in Zagreb, Croatia, between 21 and 27 May 2007. The tournament was won by Wang Liqin of China.

Seeds

  Ma Lin (final)
  Wang Liqin (champion)
  Timo Boll (quarterfinals)
  Wang Hao (semifinals)
  Oh Sang-eun (fourth round)
  Vladimir Samsonov (quarterfinals)
  Chen Qi (fourth round)
  Ma Long (fourth round)
  Ryu Seung-min (semifinals)
  Hao Shuai (quarterfinals)
  Werner Schlager (first round)
  Li Ching (second round)
  Hou Yingchao (fourth round)
  Joo Sae-hyuk (quarterfinals)
  Kalinikos Kreanga (fourth round)
  Chuang Chih-yuan (fourth round)
  Chen Weixing (third round)
  Alexey Smirnov (first round)
  Michael Maze (second round)
  Petr Korbel (first round)
  Lee Jung-woo (third round)
  Ko Lai Chak (second round)
  Gao Ning (fourth round)
  Yo Kan (third round)
  Adrian Crișan (first round)
  Zoran Primorac (first round)
  Cheung Yuk (second round)
  Lucjan Błaszczyk (second round)
  Chiang Peng-lung (third round)
  Yang Zi (second round)
  Jean-Michel Saive (third round)
  Damien Éloi (first round)

Finals

Main draw

Top half

Section 1

Section 2

Section 3

Section 4

Bottom half

Section 5

Section 6

Section 7

Section 8

References

External links
Drawsheet - Men's singles

-